The Australian middleweight boxing championship is a title administrated by the Australian National Boxing Federation. The current Australian middleweight champion is Issac Hardman.

Recognition
In 1886 a boxing match between Jack Donohue and Alf Pickering at Foley's Gymnasium in Sydney was promoted as being for the middleweight champion of Australia, however the winner was not referred to as the middleweight champion after the fight and neither boxer was ever promoted as defending the title. Billy McCarthy was being referred to as middleweight champion of Australia as of 1886 however his matches were not promoted as though it was an official title which was on the line.

In January 1889 a bout between Bob Fitzsimmons and Jim Hall at Foley's Gymnasium in Sydney was promoted as being for the middleweight championship, however again no champion was announced after the fight which was won by Fitzsimmons. In October 1889 another match involving Jim Hall, this time against Jim Fogarty, was promoted as a match for the middleweight championship again, and it was also referred to as a championship match after the result, although because it was a draw there was still no champion named.

Despite not winning a 'championship match' Jim Hall had adopted the title of champion middleweight of New South Wales as of 1890 due to a string of strong performances and contenders declining to fight him. In January 1890 Peter Boland, who claimed to be champion middleweight of Victoria, challenged him to a fight and they fought that month with Hall winning, which resulted in him being acknowledged as middleweight champion of Australia by the press. Hall's next match was also referred to as a match for the middleweight championship of Australia, and promotion described Jim Hall as the countries best middleweight, reflecting that it was a title defence. Promotion for a boxing match between Dan Creedon and Mick Dunn in 1892 described it as being for the middle-weight championship for Australia, due to Creedon being the best middle-weight in Victoria and Dunn being the best middle-weight in New South Wales, and argued that the title had never been clearly defined prior.

In 1924 the company Stadiums Limited attempted to assume responsibility for the title, organizing a match for the championship after Alf Stewart refused to box for six months, however the decision was not universally acknowledged and the media still regarded Stewart as reigning champion when he returned to the ring.

Recognition of the champion became contentious in the early 1940s when champion Hockey Bennell lost a welterweight championship fight to Vic Patrick. Leichhardt Stadium management argued that the title reverted to previous title-holder Tommy Colteaux, and he was generally accepted as champion in Sydney, however Stadiums Limited grew frustrated with Colteaux refusing to accept matches and decided to reject his claim and hold a tournament to determine their own champion putting forward Alan Westbury in January, 1945. By February Westbury was generally regarded as the legitimate champion by fans, and when Hockey Bennell beat the Leichhardt 'champion' in March 1945 he was aiming to earn a fight against Westbury to become the middleweight champion, reflecting that Stadiums Limited had assumed responsibility for the title.

The title has been formally administered by the Australian National Boxing Federation (previously the Australian Boxing Federation) since 1965.

List
r – Champion relinquished title.
s – Champion stripped of title.
Italics date – Reign disputed.

List of champions

See also

List of Australian female boxing champions
List of Australian heavyweight boxing champions
List of Australian cruiserweight boxing champions
Boxing in Australia

References

External links
boxrec
Australian National Boxing Federation
Aus-Boxing Australian boxing news website

 
 

 
 
Incomplete sports result lists
Incomplete sports lists
Boxing articles needing attention
middleweight